The 2020–21 Eastern Washington Eagles men's basketball team represented Eastern Washington University in the Big Sky Conference during the 2020–21 NCAA Division I men's basketball season. Led by fourth-year head coach Shantay Legans, the Eagles played their home games on campus at Reese Court in Cheney, Washington.

In the regular season, EWU was 13–7 overall (12–3, Big Sky, 2nd) and was seeded second in the conference tournament, which they won. Seeded fourteenth in the West regional of the NCAA tournament, they met twelfth-ranked Kansas in the round of 64.

Previous season
The Eagles finished the 2019–20 season 23–8 (16–4 in Big Sky, first). The top seed in the Big Sky tournament, Eastern was scheduled to take on the #9 seed Sacramento State in the quarterfinals, but the tournament was cancelled due to the COVID-19 pandemic.

Roster

Schedule and results

|-
!colspan=12 style=| Non-conference regular season

|-
!colspan=12 style=| Big Sky regular season

|-
!colspan=12 style=| Big Sky tournament
|-

|-
!colspan=12 style=| NCAA tournament
|-

References

Eastern Washington Eagles men's basketball seasons
Eastern Washington Eagles
Eastern Washington Eagles men's basketball
Eastern Washington Eagles men's basketball
Eastern Washington